The common pochard (Aythya ferina) is a medium-sized diving duck. The scientific name is derived from Greek  aithuia, an unidentified seabird mentioned by authors including Hesychius and Aristotle, and Latin  ferina, "wild game", from ferus, "wild".

Description
The adult male has a long dark bill with a grey band, a red head and neck, a black breast, red eyes and a grey back. The adult female has a brown head and body and a narrower grey bill-band. The triangular head shape is distinctive. Pochards are superficially similar to the closely related North American redhead and canvasback.

Females give hoarse growls. Males have whistles cut off by a final nasal note aaoo-oo-haa.

Distribution and habitat
Their breeding habitat consists of marshes and lakes with a metre or more water depth. Pochards breed in much of temperate and northern Europe and across the Palearctic. They are migratory, and spend winter in the south and west of Europe.

In the British Isles, birds breed in eastern England and lowland Scotland, in small numbers in Northern Ireland with numbers increasing gradually, and sporadically in the Republic of Ireland, where it may also be increasing. While uncommon, individuals are also occasionally seen in the south of England, and small populations are sometimes observed on the River Thames. Large numbers stay overwinter in Great Britain, after the birds retreat from Russia and Scandinavia.

Ecology

These are gregarious birds, forming large flocks in winter, often mixed with other diving ducks such as the tufted duck.

These birds feed mainly by diving or dabbling. They eat aquatic plants with some molluscs, aquatic insects and small fish. They often feed at night, and will up-end for food as well as the more characteristic diving. According to the article 'Patterns in the diving behaviour of the pochard, Aythya ferina: a test of an optimality model' Pochard's have a behavioral preference when it comes to their feeding patterns. This behavioral preference is that Pochards prefer shallower water in comparison to deeper water even though the food concentration in deeper water may be higher.

In a number of countries the population of Common Pochard is decreasing mainly due to urbanization of the natural habitats and their transformation, as well as due to overhunting.
The pochard is one of the species to which the Agreement on the Conservation of African-Eurasian Migratory Waterbirds (AEWA) applies.

Gallery

References

Further reading

External links

 Pochard at RSPB Birds by Name
 
 
 
 
 
 

common pochard
Birds of Eurasia
Birds of Africa
Birds of North Africa
common pochard
common pochard